Ardennes Fury (also known as Battle of the Ardennes: Fury) is a 2014 direct-to-video war film directed by Joseph J. Lawson. The film, produced by B-movie film company The Asylum, stars Tom Stedham, Bill Voorhees, Tino Struckman, Lawrence C. Garnell Jr., Lauren Vera, Yaron Urbas. Ardennes Fury is a mockbuster of Fury.

Premise
In the late Autumn of 1944 before the Battle of the Bulge campaign, an American tank unit gets trapped behind enemy lines. The Allies' Operation Ardennes Fury is about to commence when the tank's commander moves to rescue innocent children and nuns from a nearby orphanage.

Although presumably meant to be set in the German Ardennes offensive, which took place in winter, the film was clearly filmed in summer.

Cast
 Tom Stedham as Sgt. Lance Dawson
 Bill Voorhees as Pvt. C.K. Luinstra
 Tino Struckman as Maj. Heston Zeller
 Lawrence C. Garnell Jr. as Sgt. Nathaniel Rose
 Lauren Vera as Sister Claudette
 Yaron Urbas as Cpl. Michael Griffin
 Analiese Anderson as Mother Mary
 Trey Hough as Sgt. Freddie McNay
 Elvin Manges as Cpl. Donald Gunderson
 Kyle Golden as Pvt. Richard Somers

Release
Ardennes Fury was released direct-to-DVD on November 11, 2014.

Critical reception
Like many of The Asylum's "mockbusters", the film received universally negative reviews.

References

External links
 Official site at The Asylum
 

2014 films
2014 direct-to-video films
2010s action war films
2014 independent films
American action war films
American historical films
American independent films
The Asylum films
Direct-to-video action films
Western Front of World War II films
Films shot in Alabama
Films set in 1944
American World War II films
Ardennes in fiction
2010s English-language films
World War II films based on actual events
2010s American films